Steve Rash is an American film director and producer best known for directing such films as Son In Law, The Buddy Holly Story, Can't Buy Me Love, Queens Logic, Bring It On: All or Nothing and Bring It On: In It to Win It.

References

External links 

American film directors
American film producers
Living people
Place of birth missing (living people)
Year of birth missing (living people)